Cayo Central is an electoral constituency in the Cayo District represented in the House of Representatives of the National Assembly of Belize since 2020 by Alex Balona of the People's United Party (PUP).

Profile

The Cayo Central constituency was one of 10 new seats created for the 1984 general election. Cayo Central consists of an area in north-central Cayo District including Georgeville and the Santa Elena section of western San Ignacio.

Cayo Central is a bellwether constituency in Belize. Since its creation the party which won the constituency went on to win the general election overall.

Area Representatives

Elections

References

Belizean House constituencies established in 1984
Political divisions in Belize
Cayo Central